This is a list of astronomical observatories in Ukraine:

Andrushivka Astronomical Observatory
Biały Słoń
Crimean Astrophysical Observatory
Mykolayiv Astronomical Observatory
Simeiz Observatory

Radio telescopes 
Giant Ukrainian Radio Telescope
Ukrainian T-shaped Radio telescope, second modification

Ukraine
Ukraine education-related lists
Lists of buildings and structures in Ukraine